The 1998 MLB Japan All-Star Series was the sixth edition of the championship, a best-of-eight series between the All-Star teams from Major League Baseball (MLB) and Nippon Professional Baseball (NPB), then-called All-Japan.

MLB won the series by 6–2–0 and Sammy Sosa was named MVP.

This is the first - and as of 2014, the only series that was solely held at the Tokyo Dome

Results 
Championship

Rosters

MLB All-Stars roster

NPB All-Stars (All-Japan) roster

References

MLB Japan All-Star Series
1998 in Japanese sport
1998 in baseball